Roman Virolainen (and ; born 1981) is a Russian cross-country skier. He participated at the 2002 Winter Olympics in Salt Lake City, where he represented Belarus. He placed 13th in the 15 km, and also competed in the sprint, 10 km pursuit, and the relay.

References

1981 births
Living people
Belarusian male cross-country skiers
Cross-country skiers at the 2002 Winter Olympics
Olympic cross-country skiers of Belarus
Belarusian people of Finnish descent